Oh Se-jung is a South Korean politician and physicist. He has served as the director of the Korean Federation of Science and Technology Societies, the first president of the Institute for Basic Science, and the 27th president of Seoul National University.

Education
Oh entered Kyunggi High School of Gangnam District in 1968 and graduated in 1971. He next graduated from Seoul National University in 1975 with a Bachelor of Physics. Moving to the U.S., he did a combined M.S. and Ph.D. in physics at Stanford University graduating in 1981.

Career
Staying in California, Oh worked as a researcher at the Palo Alto Institute of Xerox until 1984, in which he returned to Korea to work as a professor at the Department of Physics and Astronomy in Seoul National University (SNU). He then worked as a research at the International Center for Theoretical Physics from 1987. During this time, he was a visiting researcher and professor at the University of Michigan and University of Tokyo, respectively. Returning to SNU, he was the head of the Planning Lab under the College of National Sciences. He later served as the director of the Multi-Systems Research Center for Excellence of the Ministry of Science and Technology with the last several years overlapping as the director and later vice chairman of the Korean Federation of Science and Technology Societies. His next position was as the founding president of the Institute for Basic Science. He left to pursue the president's office at SNU, where he scored highly in the policy evaluation before losing to Sung Nak-in, who became the 26th president of SNU. Oh worked in politics before again applying for and eventually getting the position at SNU as the 27th president. He was inaugurated on February 8, 2019.

Awards
2003: Scientists Worth Emulating,  Korea Science Foundation
1997: Korea Science Award
1994: Outstanding Paper, Korea Federation of Science and Technology Societies

See also
 Kim Doochul
 Noh Do Young

References

External links
Message from the President: Seoul National University recommences its mission as a leading institution of higher education

1954 births
Living people
Seoul National University alumni
Presidents of the Institute for Basic Science
Academic staff of Seoul National University
Xerox people
Korean politicians
Stanford University alumni
South Korean physicists
National Assembly (South Korea)
Presidents of Seoul National University
South Korean scientists